Lieutenant General Sir William Alexander Mackinnon  (27 June 1830 – 28 October 1897) was Director-General of the British Army Medical Service (1889–1896).

Mackinnon was born in Strath, Isle of Skye, Scotland. He studied medicine at the University of Glasgow and University of Edinburgh, graduating from Edinburgh in 1851 and receiving an FRCS qualification in 1873. In 1853, he enlisted to the 42nd Regiment of Foot as assistant-surgeon and took part in the Crimean War in Alma, Balaklava and Sevastopol, as well as in the New Zealand Maori war (1863–66). Afterwards he served as assistant professor of surgery at Netly (1866–73); Senior Medical Officer of Sir Garnet Wolseley’s Ashanti Force (1873–74); Principal Medical Officer at Aldershot, Colchester, Hong Kong, and at Malta (1874–82); Head of the medical Branch of the Director-General's Office in London (1882–87); and Principal Medical Officer at Gibraltar (1887–89).

After being knighted in the 1891 Birthday Honours, Mackinnon served as an Honorary Surgeon to the Queen. He received an honorary LLD from the University of Glasgow in 1891 and donated £2000 to the university for scholarships. Mackinnon retired on 7 May 1896 and died next year in London.

References

1830 births
1897 deaths
19th-century Scottish medical doctors
British Army regimental surgeons
British Army generals
British Army personnel of the Crimean War
People from the Isle of Skye
British military personnel of the New Zealand Wars
42nd Regiment of Foot officers
Knights Commander of the Order of the Bath